Benjamin Fry is an American designer who has expertise in data visualization.

Early life and education 
Fry was born in 1975 in Ann Arbor, Michigan (born 1975). Fry received his BFA in Communication Design, minor in Computer Science at the Carnegie Mellon University. He received Master and Ph.D. degrees from the Aesthetics and Computation Group at the MIT Media Lab, under the direction of John Maeda. His doctoral dissertation, "Computational Information Design" introduces the seven stages of visualizing data: acquiring, parsing, filtering, mining, representing, refining and interacting.

Career 
During his time at MIT Media Lab, Fry co-developed Processing, an open-source programming language and integrated development environment (IDE) built for the electronic arts and visual design communities with the purpose of teaching the basics of computer programming in a visual context. The Processing design environment developed together with Casey Reas won a Golden Nica from the Prix Ars Electronica in 2005. During 2006–2007, Fry was the Nierenberg Chair of Design for the Carnegie Mellon School of Design. He is a principal of Fathom, a design and software consultancy in Boston, Massachusetts.

Fry's artwork has been featured in the Cooper-Hewitt Design Triennial (2003, 2006) and the Whitney Biennial (2002), and at the Museum of Modern Art in New York (2001, 2008), Ars Electronica in Linz, Austria (2000, 2002, 2005) and in the films Minority Report and The Hulk. He is the winner of the 2011 National Design Award in category "Interaction Design."

Books 
2007: (with Casey Reas) Processing: A Programming Handbook for Visual Designers and Artists, MIT Press
2007: Visualizing Data, O'Reilly
2010: (with Casey Reas) Getting Started with Processing, O'Reilly
2015: (with Casey Reas and Lauren McCarthy) Getting Started with p5.js, O'Reilly

See also
 Timeline of programming languages
 Processing programming language

References

External links

1975 births
Living people
People from Massachusetts
Massachusetts Institute of Technology alumni
American computer scientists
American designers
American digital artists
Carnegie Mellon University faculty
Information graphic designers
MIT Media Lab people